A calcicole, calciphyte or calciphile is a plant that thrives in lime rich soil. The word is derived from the Latin 'to dwell on chalk'. Under acidic conditions, aluminium becomes more soluble and phosphate less. As a consequence, calcicoles grown on acidic soils often develop the symptoms of aluminium toxicity, i.e. necrosis, and phosphate deficiency, i.e. anthocyanosis (reddening of the leaves) and stunting.

A plant that thrives in acid soils is known as a calcifuge.

A plant thriving on sand (which may be acidic or calcic) is termed psammophilic or arenaceous (see also arenite).

Examples of calcicole plants
 Ash trees (Fraxinus spp.) 
 Honeysuckle (Lonicera) 
 Buddleja 
 Lilac (Syringa)
 Beet
 Clematis
 Sanguisorba minor
 Some European orchids
 Some succulent plants genera Sansevieria and Titanopsis or cacti genus Thelocactus.
 Calcicolous grasses

References

Plant physiology